Versailles–Rive Droite is a railway station in the Parisian suburb of Versailles (department of Yvelines). It is located in the Île-de-France region of France and is part of the Transilien rail network, on the Paris–Saint-Lazare – Versailles–Rive Droite line. The western terminus of that line, it is situated in the Notre-Dame section of the town.

The name "Rive Droite" refers to the trains' Paris destination (Saint-Lazare) being on the right bank of the Seine.

History 
James Mayer de Rothschild received the concession to build a rail line from Paris to Versailles.  Designed by state engineers, the line shared a common trunk from Gare Saint-Lazare to Asnières-sur-Seine.  The line was opened by the sons of Louis-Philippe on 2 August 1839.

The station was designed by the architect Alfred Armand.

Services 
The station is served by line L trains of the Transilien Paris - Saint Lazare network. It is the terminus of the eponymous branch of the Transilien L South network.

It is one of five stations in Versailles. It is a terminal station with two tracks at platform, as well as six siding tracks and two yard leads, and it serves as a coach yard for line L South.

See also 
 Other train stations in Versailles:
 Versailles–Rive Gauche station
 Versailles–Chantiers station
 Gare de Montreuil
 Porchefontaine station

External links
 

Railway stations in Yvelines
Transport in Versailles
Railway stations in France opened in 1839